Bielovce is a village and municipality in the Levice District in the Nitra Region of south-west Slovakia.

History
In historical records the village was first mentioned in 1138.

Geography
The village lies at an altitude of 117 metres and covers an area of 11.385 km².
It has a population of about 250 people.

Ethnicity
The village is about 92% Magyar, 6% Slovak and 2% Czech.

Facilities
The village has a public library, a swimming pool and a  football pitch.

Genealogical resources

The records for genealogical research are available at the state archive "Statny Archiv in Banska Bystrica, Nitra, Slovakia"

 Roman Catholic church records (births/marriages/deaths): 1714-1896 (parish B)
 Lutheran church records (births/marriages/deaths): 1793-1895 (parish B)
 Reformated church records (births/marriages/deaths): 1825-1895 (parish B)

See also
 List of municipalities and towns in Slovakia

External links
https://web.archive.org/web/20080111223415/http://www.statistics.sk/mosmis/eng/run.html 
Surnames of living people in Bielovce

Villages and municipalities in Levice District